Moi dix Mois (lit. "Me Ten Months" in French) is a Japanese visual kei gothic metal band, founded in 2002 by Mana after Malice Mizer paused activities. The guitarist and sole songwriter has been the only constant member in a series of lineup changes, and the band's material is released on his own record label Midi:Nette.

History
March 19, 2002, approximately three months after Malice Mizer announced their indefinite hiatus, Mana announced the formation of his solo project, Moi dix Mois. Their first single, "Dialogue Symphonie", was released October 19 of the same year.

Moi dix Mois played their first concerts outside Japan in March 2005 in Munich, Germany and Paris, France as part of their Invite to Immorality Tour. After the tour's final show on April 24, 2005 in Tokyo, singer Juka left the band.

A new phase of the band began on March 1, 2006, when they released the album, Beyond the Gate. This featured a new vocalist named Seth. Before the album was released, Mana indicated that the sound would be the beginning of a renewed direction for the band, possibly more integrated towards electronic music. After the announcement of the Beyond the Gate release was made, Seth was revealed as the new vocalist, and it was announced that Kazuno (bass) and Tohru (drums) were both leaving the group.

In June 2006, Moi dix Mois headlined the Wave-Gotik-Treffen in Leipzig, Germany. They then returned to touring in Japan. A prospective five city tour in the United States was scheduled for July 2006, but cancelled due to the band citing "differences in policies" with the tour organizer; however, Mana did make a U.S. appearance at the 2006 Anime Expo in Anaheim, CA on July 1, where he announced that Moi dix Mois was planning to tour America sometime "within the calendar year". However, this US tour did not materialize in 2006.

On March 28, 2007, they released their fourth album, Dixanadu, the first with the current lineup. On December 27, 2008, Moi dix Mois held the Dis Inferno Vol.VI ~Last Year Party~, where they played a session gig along with Mana's fellow Malice Mizer guitarist Közi.

They performed at Anime Expo 2009, the largest anime convention in North America, on July 2 at the Los Angeles Convention Center. Also in July they went on a short two-gig coupling tour with Közi called Deep Sanctuary, playing on the 17 in Osaka and the 19 in Tokyo. At the V-Rock Festival '09 on October 24, Moi Dix Mois played two new songs, "Dead Scape" and "The Sect", and a new version of "The Prophet".

In July 2010, they went on another tour with Közi, titled Deep Sanctuary II, this time with Malice Mizer bassist Yu~ki as a special guest at Akasaka Blitz on the 17. This was the first time in 9 years that the three Malice Mizer members were on stage together. Moi dix Mois' fifth album, D+Sect, was released on December 15, 2010.

On August 27, 2011, Mana announced that Moi dix Mois will be releasing a compilation album as part of their 10th anniversary celebration. The album is composed of re-recordings of older songs, from the group's first two albums, by the current line-up. Fans requested which songs were chosen through Mana's blog. The album, titled Reprise, was released on July 11, 2012 and includes the new song "Je l'aime". On April 7, 2012, Moi dix Mois performed at Sakura-Con 2012 in Seattle, Washington.

To celebrate their tenth anniversary, Moi dix Mois held a special concert at Shinjuku Blaze on March 20, 2013. At the end, former members Juka, Kazuno and Tohru reunited with Mana for a one-off performance of the group's original lineup.

On May 19, 2014, guitarist K was found dead at his home by relatives. A memorial concert was held on September 15 where Moi dix Mois performed, including the new song "Beast Side" that was composed in memory of the guitarist. His replacement, Ryux formerly from the band Omega Dripp, was announced by Mana on December 3.

Member history
Moi dix Mois has experienced numerous lineup changes, with leader and guitarist Mana the only constant member. Vocalist Juka and bassist Kazuno were employed from Moi dix Mois' conception, with Tohru originally a support drummer. Tohru officially joined with the release of "Shadows Temple" in May 2004. K was introduced as guitarist and "death vocalist" with the Dis Inferno III event in December 2004.

At the end of the Invite to Immorality Tour on April 24, 2005, Juka announced that he would be leaving. A year later, Kazuno and Tohru left with the release of Beyond the Gate. At the same time, Seth was announced as being added to the project as their new vocalist.

Sugiya and Hayato provided live support until the release of "Lamentful Miss", which included them for the first time as full members. After K's death in 2014, he was replaced by Ryux.

The current lineup consists of:
 Mana – guitars, keyboards, programming
 Seth – vocals
 Sugiya – bass
 Hayato – drums
 Ryux – guitars

Discography
Studio albums
 Dix Infernal (March 19, 2003), Oricon Albums Chart Peak Position: No. 77
 Nocturnal Opera (July 20, 2004) No. 116
 Beyond the Gate (March 1, 2006) No. 84
 Dixanadu (March 28, 2007) No. 158
 D+Sect (December 15, 2010) No. 113

Compilation albums
 Reprise (July 11, 2012) No. 102

Singles
 "Dialogue Symphonie" (November 19, 2002), Oricon Singles Chart Peak Position: No. 97
 "Shadows Temple" (May 31, 2004) No. 103
 "Pageant" (October 6, 2004) No. 40
 "Lamentful Miss" (October 4, 2006) No. 73

DVDs
 Dix Infernal ~Scars of Sabbath~ (December 16, 2003), Oricon DVDs Chart Peak Position: No. 274
 Europe Tour 2005 -Invite to Immorality- (July 27, 2005)
 Dixanadu ~Fated "Raison d'être"~ Europe Tour 2007 (January 30, 2008) No. 206

References

External links

 Official website
 Official MySpace

Gan-Shin artists
Visual kei musical groups
Japanese gothic metal musical groups
Japanese symphonic metal musical groups
Industrial metal musical groups
Musical groups established in 2002
Musical quintets
2002 establishments in Japan
Trisol Music Group artists